The 2011–12 Providence Friars men's basketball team represented Providence College in the Big East Conference. For the third straight season, the team finished with a 4–14 conference record, while amassing a 15–17 record overall.

Replacing Keno Davis, who was fired following the 2010–11 season, Providence native Ed Cooley took over as head coach and his first season with the Friars would come without departing seniors Marshon Brooks, who was a first-round selection in the 2011 NBA Draft after leading the Big East in scoring in 2010–11, and reserve center Ray Hall. In addition, sophomore guard Duke Mondy, freshman guard Dre Evans, and redshirt freshman guard Xavier Davis all did not return to the team or transferred, while incoming freshman guard Kiwi Gardner was deemed ineligible to play in the 2011–12 season by the NCAA.

With just nine scholarship players available, the Friars had three players in the top five in the conference for minutes played per game, including freshman forward LaDontae Henton (37.2 minutes per game), who was named the Big East All-Rookie Team, and sophomore guard Bryce Cotton (38.6 minutes per game). Leading the conference in both minutes per game (38.7) and assists per game (7.5) was junior guard Vincent Council, who was selected to the All-Big East Third Team.

The Friars managed four conference wins, but defeated #14 Louisville at home, 90–59, on January 10. The Friars did not receive votes in either the AP Poll or Coaches' Poll at any point in the season. They finished 15th in the conference and were defeated by Seton Hall in the first round of the 2012 Big East men's basketball tournament.

Roster

Depth chart

Incoming recruits

Schedule 

|-
!colspan=8| Exhibition games

|-

|-
!colspan=8| Non-conference games

|-
!colspan=8| Big East regular season

|-
!colspan=8| Big East tournament

Awards and honors

References

External links
2011–12 Providence Friars men's basketball media guide

Providence Friars men's basketball seasons
Providence Friars
Providence
Providence